The 2019 NCAA Division I women's soccer tournament (also known as the 2019 Women's College Cup) was the 38th annual single-elimination tournament to determine the national champion of NCAA Division I women's collegiate soccer. The semifinals and championship game were played at Avaya Stadium in San Jose, California from December 6–8, 2019 while the preceding rounds were played at various sites across the country during November 2019.

Qualification

All Division I women's soccer programs are eligible to qualify for the tournament. 28 teams received automatic bids by winning their conference tournaments, 3 teams received automatic bids by claiming the conference regular season crown (Ivy League, Pac-12 Conference, and West Coast Conference don't hold conference tournaments), and an additional 33 teams earned at-large bids based on their regular season records.  The bracket was released on November 11, 2019

Stanford Section

Prairie View won its first-ever conference title this year, but this is their second time to earn a berth in the tournament. In 2014, they were the SWAC tournament runner-up but earn the conference's berth to the NCAA tournament since the winner (Howard) was ineligible that year.

Florida State Section

Virginia Section

North Carolina Section

Bracket
The bracket was announced on Monday, November 11, 2019.

Stanford Bracket

* Host institution

Schedule

First round

Second round

Round of 16

Quarterfinals 

Rankings from United Soccer Coaches Final Regular Season Rankings

Florida State Bracket

* Host institution

Schedule

First round

Second round

Round of 16

Quarterfinals 

Rankings from United Soccer Coaches Final Regular Season Rankings

Virginia Bracket

* Host institution

Schedule

First round

Second round

Round of 16

Quarterfinals 

Rankings from United Soccer Coaches Final Regular Season Rankings

North Carolina Bracket

* Host institution

Schedule

First round

Second round

Round of 16

Quarterfinals 

Rankings from United Soccer Coaches Final Regular Season Rankings

College Cup

Schedule

Semi-finals

Final 

Rankings from United Soccer Coaches Final Regular Season Rankings

Record by conference 

The R32, S16, E8, F4, CG, and NC columns indicate how many teams from each conference were in the Round of 32 (second round), Round of 16 (third round), Quarterfinals, Semi-finals, Final, and National Champion, respectively.
The following conferences received one bid and finished the tournament with a record of 0–1–0: A10, America East, ASUN, Big Sky, Big South, Big West, C-USA, Horizon, MAC, Mountain West, MVC, OVC, Patriot, SoCon, Summit, Sun Belt, Southland, SWAC, WAC.  In the interest of conserving space, these teams are not shown in the table.

Statistics

Goalscorers

See also 
 NCAA Women's Soccer Championships (Division II, Division III)
 NCAA Men's Soccer Championships (Division I, Division II, Division III)

References

NCAA
NCAA Women's Soccer Championship
Tournament
NCAA Division I Women's Soccer Tournament
NCAA Division I Women's Soccer Tournament
NCAA Division I Women's Soccer Tournament